Ramón "El Profesor" Bragaña Palacios (May 11, 1909 – May 11, 1985) was a Cuban baseball pitcher and outfielder in the Negro leagues and the Mexican League.

A native of Havana, Cuba, Bragaña played professionally from 1928 to 1955, mostly with the Cuban Stars (East) (1928–1930), the Azules de Veracruz (1940–1951), and the Águila de Veracruz (1955). He was elected to the Cuban Baseball Hall of Fame in 1959, and the Salón de la Fama del Beisbol Profesional de México in 1964.

See also

 List of members of the Mexican Professional Baseball Hall of Fame

References

External links
 and Baseball-Reference Black Baseball stats and Seamheads
Ramon Bragana at Negro League Baseball Players Association
 Ramon Bragaña biography from Society for American Baseball Research (SABR)

1909 births
1985 deaths
Agrario de México players
Azules de Veracruz players
Charros de Jalisco players
Cuban baseball players
Cuban Stars (East) players
Diablos Rojos del México players
Indios de Anahuac players
Mexican Baseball Hall of Fame inductees
Mexican League baseball managers
Mexican League baseball pitchers
Rojos del Águila de Veracruz players
Sultanes de Monterrey players
Cuban expatriate baseball players in Mexico
Baseball pitchers